Oxacme dissimilis is a moth of the subfamily Arctiinae. It was described by George Hampson in 1894. It is found in Sikkim, India.

References

Cisthenina
Moths described in 1894